Ashley is a village in Delaware County, Ohio, United States. The population was 1,330 at the 2010 census.

Ashley students attend the Buckeye Valley Local School District.

History
Ashley was laid out in 1849. Ashley is the name of L. W. Ashley, one of the original owners of the town site.

Geography
Ashley is located at  (40.408562, -82.952734).

Demographics

2010 census
As of the census of 2010, there were 1,330 people, 503 households, and 342 families living in the village. The racial makeup of the village was 97.2% White, 0.5% African American, 0.1% Native American, 0.2% Asian, 0.1% from other races, and 2.0% from two or more races. Hispanic or Latino of any race were 1.5% of the population.

There were 503 households, of which 36.8% had children under the age of 18 living with them, 47.7% were married couples living together, 14.9% had a female householder with no husband present, 5.4% had a male householder with no wife present, and 32.0% were non-families. 26.8% of all households were made up of individuals, and 11.1% had someone living alone who was 65 years of age or older. The average household size was 2.62 and the average family size was 3.12.

The median age in the village was 36.3 years. 27.1% of residents were under the age of 18; 7.5% were between the ages of 18 and 24; 26.3% were from 25 to 44; 25.4% were from 45 to 64; and 13.6% were 65 years of age or older. The gender makeup of the village was 47.1% male and 52.9% female.

2000 census
As of the census of 2000, there were 1,216 people, 469 households, and 324 families living in the village. The population density was 2,241.4 people per square mile (869.4/km2). There were 500 housing units at an average density of 921.6 per square mile (357.5/km2). The racial makeup of the village was 96.96% White, 0.99% African American, 0.33% Native American, 0.08% Pacific Islander, 0.25% from other races, and 1.40% from two or more races. Hispanic or Latino of any race were 0.82% of the population.

There were 469 households, out of which 35.4% had children under the age of 18 living with them, 51.4% were married couples living together, 12.8% had a female householder with no husband present, and 30.9% were non-families. 27.3% of all households were made up of individuals, and 12.8% had someone living alone who was 65 years of age or older. The average household size was 2.57 and the average family size was 3.06.

In the village, the population was spread out, with 29.5% under the age of 18, 7.8% from 18 to 24, 31.3% from 25 to 44, 18.3% from 45 to 64, and 13.1% who were 65 years of age or older. The median age was 34 years. For every 100 females there were 90.9 males. For every 100 females age 18 and over, there were 85.1 males.

The median income for a household in the village was $38,239, and the median income for a family was $42,313. Males had a median income of $31,667 versus $25,000 for females. The per capita income for the village was $15,513. About 10.2% of families and 12.7% of the population were below the poverty line, including 13.8% of those under age 18 and 24.4% of those age 65 or over.

Public services
Emergency medical services for the Village of Ashley and its surrounding area are provided by the Delaware County EMS.

References

Villages in Delaware County, Ohio
Villages in Ohio